The 1994 United States Shadow Senator election in the District of Columbia took place on November 8, 1994, to elect a shadow member to the United States Senate to represent the District of Columbia. The member was only recognized by the District of Columbia and not officially sworn or seated by the United States Senate. Incumbent Shadow Senator Florence Pendleton won reelection to a second term.

Primary elections
Party primaries took place on September 13, 1994.

Democratic primary

Candidates
 Florence Pendleton, incumbent Shadow Senator
 Stephen Sellows, disability rights activist

Campaign
Pendleton, first elected four years earlier as one of the first two Shadow Senators from the District, faced Stephen "Steve" Sellows, an advocate for the rights of the disabled. Pendleton easily won the primary, and Sellows was beaten to death less than a year following the election.

Results

General election
Pendleton faced Republican Julie Finley, the chairwoman of the District of Columbia Republican Party (who won the Republican nomination via write-ins), and D.C. Statehood candidate Mel Edwards, a public relations expert. As is usual for Democrats in the District, Pendleton won in a landslide.

Candidates
 Florence Pendleton (Democratic)
 Julie Finley (Republican)
 Mel Edwards (D.C. Statehood)

Results

References

United States Shadow Senator
1994